The 1904 Kansas Jayhawks football team was an American football team that represented the University of Kansas as an independent during the 1904 college football season. In their first season under head coach A. R. Kennedy, the Jayhawks compiled an 8–1–1 record and outscored opponents by a combined total of 179 to 38. The Jayhawks played their home games at McCook Field in Lawrence, Kansas. Albert Hicks was the team captain.

Schedule

References

Kansas
Kansas Jayhawks football seasons
Kansas Jayhawks football